Archaeology is the study of ancient cultures through examination of the artifacts they left behind.

Archaeology may also refer to:
 Archaeology, an 1879 book by Alfred Percival Maudslay (part of Biologia Centrali-Americana) 
 Archaeology (magazine)
 Archaeology (album), a 1996 album by The Rutles

See also
 The Archaeologist, a magazine
 The Archeologist, a 1914 silent film